Venezuela is scheduled to compete at the 2023 Pan American Games in Santiago, Chile from October 20 to November 5, 2023. This will be Venezuela's 19th appearance at the Pan American Games, having competed at every edition of the games since the inaugural edition in 1951.

Competitors
The following is the list of number of competitors (per gender) participating at the games per sport/discipline.

Archery

Venezuela qualified one archer during the 2022 Pan American Archery Championships.

Women

Basketball

Venezuela qualified a men's team (of 12 athletes) by finishing seventh in the 2022 FIBA Americup.

Men's tournament

Summary

Bowling

Venezuela qualified a full team of two men and two women through the 2022 South American Games held in Asuncion, Paraguay.

Boxing

Venezuela qualified one female boxer by reaching the final of the 2022 South American Games.

Women

Cycling

BMX
Venezuela qualified two male cyclists in BMX race through the UCI World Rankings.

Racing

Football

Women's tournament

Venezuela qualified a women's team of 18 athletes after finishing sixth at the 2022 Copa América Femenina in Colombia. Venezuela's women's team will be making its Pan American Games debut.

Summary

Judo

Venezuela has qualified two judokas (one man and one woman) after winning the categories at the 2021 Junior Pan American Games.

Men

Women

Modern pentathlon

Venezuela qualified three modern pentathletes (two men and one woman).

Sailing

Venezuela has qualified 2 boats for a total of 2 sailors.

Men

Women

Shooting

Venezuela qualified a total of five shooters after the 2022 Americas Shooting Championships. Venezuela also qualified one shooter during the 2022 South American Games.

Men
Pistol and rifle

Men
Shotgun

Women
Pistol and rifle

Softball

Venezuela qualified a women's team (of 18 athletes) by virtue of its campaign in the 2022 Pan American Championships.

Summary

Wrestling

Venezuela qualified four wrestlers (Men's Freestyle: 125 kg), (Women's Freestyle: 53 kg, 68 kg and 76 kg) through the 2022 Pan American Wrestling Championships held in Acapulco, Mexico.   Venezuela also qualified one wrestler (Women's Freestyle: 62 kg) by winning the 2021 Junior Pan American Games. 

Men

Women

See also
Venezuela at the 2024 Summer Olympics

References

Nations at the 2023 Pan American Games
2023
2023 in Venezuelan sport